The Birdcatcher is a 2019 film directed by British film-maker Ross Clarke and written by Trond Morten Kristensen. Set in Nazi-occupied Norway, supposedly based on a composite of real cases, it concerns Esther, a Jewish girl, who lives disguised as be boy on a Norwegian farm.

Danish actrees Sarah-Sofie Boussnina plays Esther, Jakob Cedergren plays farmer and Norwegian collaborationist Johann. His wife Anna (Laura Birn) is secretly in an affair with a German officer (August Diehl).

Awards & Festivals
Winner – Best Cinematography & Best Feature, European Cinematography Awards 2019
Winner – Best International Film, Best Actress Feature Film (Sarah-Sofie Boussnina), Best Supporting Actor (Jakob Cedergren), Best Sound & Best Cinematographer, Garden State Film Festival 2019
Winner – Best Feature, Hill Country Film Festival 2019
Nominated – Best Nordic Feature, Santa Barbara International Film Festival 2019

References

2019 films